Rohtas can refer to:

Places

India 
Rohtas Fort, India or Rohtasgarh, fort in Bihar
Rohtas district, district in Bihar, named after the fort
Rohtas block, village development block in the district, situated near the fort
Rohtas Plateau, plateau in south-western Bihar
Rohtas Nagar Assembly constituency, constituency of the Delhi Legislative Assembly

Pakistan 
Rohtas Fort, garrison fort near Dina, Punjab, UNESCO World Heritage site

People 
Rohtas Goel, Indian entrepreneur and civil engineer
Rohtas Singh Dahiya, Indian wrestler

Others
 Battle of Rohtas (1779), battle at the fort in Punjab, between the Durrani Empire and Sikh misls